ι Pegasi, Latinized as Iota Pegasi is a double-lined spectroscopic binary star system located within the northern constellation of Pegasus, along a line between Lambda and Kappa Pegasi. It is visible to the naked eye as a yellow-hued point of light with a combined apparent visual magnitude of 3.77. The system is located 38.5 light years from the Sun based on parallax, but is drifting closer with a radial velocity of −5.5 km/s.

The binary nature of this system was discovered by W. W. Campbell in 1899 and the initial orbital elements were estimated by H. D. Curtis in 1904. The primary, designated component Aa, is a yellowish-white star somewhat brighter than the sun. It and the dimmer component Ab orbit each other with a period of about 10 days and an eccentricity of almost zero, meaning they essentially have a circular orbit. They appear to be very young stars, close to zero-age main sequence.

In about four billion years from now, component Aa will evolve off the main sequence into a giant. In the process it will overflow its Roche lobe and begin to transfer mass onto the secondary. This may cause the secondary to acquire enough mass to become the primary component. After both stars have passed through the giant star stage, the end result will be a pair of co-orbiting white dwarfs in about eight billion years.

References

External links

F-type main-sequence stars
G-type main-sequence stars
Pegasi, Iota
Spectroscopic binaries

Pegasi, Iota
Pegasus (constellation)
Durchmusterung objects
Pegasi, 24
109176
210027
8430